Korucuk  is a village in Gülnar district of Mersin Province, Turkey. The population of the village was 215 as of 2012. Although there are several theories about the origin of the village name, the most plausible is that it refers to forests around the village (Koru means a "small forest")  There are ancient rock tombs around the village and the ruins of an ancient church in the village. The ancestors of the present residents however were migrants from Central Asia.
Major economic activity is agriculture. There is no shortage in irrigation water and the village produces fresh vegetables.

References

Villages in Gülnar District